LME Copper stands for a group of spot, forward, and futures contracts, trading on the London Metal Exchange (LME), for delivery of Copper (Grade A), that can be used for price hedging, physical delivery of sales or purchases, investment, and speculation.

As of December 31, 2019, LME Copper contracts are associated with 144,675 tonnes of physical copper stored in LME approved warehouses around the world, or around 0.7% of 2019 world copper production of 20.6 million tonnes. Despite the small share of physical copper associated with LME Copper contracts, their prices act as reference prices for physical global copper transactions. This practice started in 1966, when Zambia, Chile, and most Copper-producing countries abandoned fixed price copper contracts, and announced that they would set copper contract prices based the average monthly price of the nearest contract month LME Copper futures contract. This pattern of using LME futures contract prices as reference prices for physical transactions spread to other base metals in the 1970s, and for Aluminium in the 1980s.

Contract description
LME Copper contracts trade on the London Metal Exchange, which began trading in the metal at the start of the exchange in 1877. The contracts require physical delivery of the asset for settlement, and deliverable assets for the contracts are 25 tonnes of Grade A copper cathode. The contracts prices are quoted in US dollars per tonne. 

LME prices have minimum tick sizes of $0.50 per tonne (or $12.50 for one contract) for open outcry trading in the LME Ring and electronic trading on LMEselect, while minimum tick sizes are reduced for inter-office telephone trading to $0.01 per tonne (or $0.50 for one contract). Carry trades involving Aluminium futures also have reduced minimum tick sizes at $0.01 per tonne. Contracts are organized along LME's prompt date (or delivery date) structure.

Prompt date structure
LME offers three groups of LME Copper contracts with daily, weekly, and monthly delivery dates. Contracts with daily settlement dates are available from two days to three months in the future, which means that on 2020-05-12, contracts with daily delivery dates for 2020-05-14, 2020-05-18, 2020-05-19 ... 2020-08-10, 2020-08-11, and 2020-08-12 are available for trading. Contracts with weekly settlement dates are available from three months to six months in the future, which means that on 2020-05-12, contracts with weekly delivery dates for 2020-08-12, 2020-08-19, 2020-08-26 ... 2020-11-12, 2020-11-18, and 2020-11-25 are available for trading. Contracts with monthly settlement dates are available from six months to 123 months in the future, which means that on 2020-05-12, contracts with monthly delivery dates for 2020-05-20, 2020-06-17, 2020-07-15, ... 2030-06-19, 2030-07-17, and 2030-08-21 are available for trading.

The origins of the LME prompt date system, in particular the three months daily prompt date system, actually originated with LME Copper trading at the beginning of the exchange. The opening of the Suez Canal in 1869 reduced the London delivery time of Tin from Malaya to match the three months delivery time for Copper from Chile. When the LME was founded in 1877 based on Copper and Tin trading, the exchange instituted the daily prompt date contracts to match the delivery times of those commodities.

Non-commercial uses
LME Copper contracts with delivery dates up to 123 months into the future are available, and prices of those contracts can produce forecasts of the spot price of Copper at those delivery times. However, LME Copper price forecasts of spot copper prices were found to exhibit biases.

LME Copper futures prices are also a part of the S&P GSCI commodity index, which is a benchmark index widely followed in financial markets by traders and institutional investors. Its weighting in these commodity indices give LME Copper futures prices non-trivial influence on returns on a wide range of investment funds and portfolios. Conversely, traders and investors have become non-trivial participants in the market for LME Copper contracts, and have had a better track record than commercial participants in the copper supply chain at predicting copper industrial cycles.

LME Copper has been used as important financial and economic signals. Contract prices have been used as signals for general financial market conditions and equity market return. They have also been used as leading indicators for economic activity and business cycles.

Related derivatives
The Chicago Mercantile Exchange (CME) and the Shanghai Futures Exchange (SHFE) also offer Copper futures contracts. Market studies have show that all three markets are closely linked, and that LME traded copper contracts are the dominant source of price discovery for the other exchanges.

Financial market conventions and empirical studies have grouped copper futures contracts with other base metals futures contracts together as an asset class or a sub-asset class. The Base Metals grouping usually includes futures contracts on Aluminium (sometimes including Aluminium Alloy contracts), Copper, Lead, Nickel, Tin, and Zinc, and they are also sometimes called Industrial Metals, Non-ferrous Metals, and Non-precious Metals. All of the metals in this group have associated LME contracts available for trading.

Sumitomo copper affair

From 1986 to 1996, the head Copper trader of Sumitomo corporation, Yasuo Hamanaka, sought to manipulate the LME Copper market by secretly building a dominant market position in LME Copper spot and futures markets. Through facetious purchasing and sale agreements, Hamanaka established the illusion of a large commercial Copper operation at Sumitomo, which allowed him to purchase large amounts of LME Copper futures contracts and warrants to corner the LME Copper market. By November 24, 1995, Hamanaka controlled 93% of all of outstanding LME copper warrants, which are claims on physical copper in the LME warehouse system. Hamanaka's Copper market position led world copper prices to rise rapidly, which led to physical copper leaving COMEX warehouses to LME warehouses, notably LME's Long Beach warehouse. The rapid movement of Copper prices and of physical Copper out of COMEX warehouses lead to investigations by the Commodity Futures Trading Commission (CFTC) and the Securities and Investments Board (SIB). Ultimately, Sumitomo cooperated with these investigations and dismissed Hamanaka, which lead Hamanaka to confess in 1996. Hamanaka's speculative position contributed to LME Contract prices to rise to $2800 per tonne in May 1996, and Sumitomo's subsequent unwinding of that position contributed to those same prices to plunge to $1785 per tonne, a two and a half year low, on June 25, 1996 almost two months later. The affair costed Sumitomo $2.6 billion USD in losses.

In response to the affair, LME began to publish more meaningful open interest data, information on large warrant and trading positions, and daily LME warehouse stocks for all relevant LME contracts, including LME Copper contracts. The affair also led seventeen commodity market regulators from sixteen countries met at the Tokyo Commodity Futures Markets Regulators' Conference to discuss proposed regulatory oversight of the world's commodity futures markets in 1997. The market regulators endorsed futures markets best practices, standards of market surveillance, and intentions for regulatory information sharing among the endorsing countries.

State Reserve Bureau copper scandal

The State Reserves Bureau Copper Scandal refers to a loss of approximately $150 million USD as a result of trading LME Copper futures contracts at the London Metal Exchange (LME) by rogue trader Liu Qibing, who was a trader for the Import and Export Department of the State Regulation Centre for Supply Reserves (SRCSR), the trading agency for the State Reserve Bureau (SRB) of China in 2005.

References

Copper
Futures markets